The Church of the Gesù is the Roman Catholic church of the Ateneo de Manila University campus in Quezon City in the Philippines. The landmark was designed by Jose Pedro Recio and Carmelo Casas. The edifice’s massive triangular structure symbolizes the Holy Trinity, as well as the three-fold mission and vision of the school. Its shape and design are also meant to suggest the outstretched arms of the Sacred Heart, and the traditional Filipino bahay kubo (nipa hut). The church is situated on Sacred Heart Hill, a small hill overlooking Bellarmine Field, believed to be the highest point in Loyola Heights. In its immediate vicinity are the dormitories (Cervini and Eliazo Halls) and the John Pollock Renewal Center. The peak cross and carillon (see below) of the church can be seen from Katipunan Avenue, which borders the campus to the west.

One side of the church houses a chapel dedicated to the Virgin Mary as the Immaculate Conception, patroness of Ateneo de Manila and of the Philippines, while another side chapel is dedicated to the Sacred Heart of Jesus, a devotion committed to the Jesuits by Jesus's appearances to Saint Margaret Mary Alacoque at a convent in Paray-le-Monial in 1671.

In front of the church is a Sacred Heart statue depicting Jesus with welcoming, outstretched arms. At the base of the statue is an inscription from Matthew 11:28: "Come to me all of you who are burdened, and I will refresh you. Take my yoke upon you and learn from me, for I am meek and gentle of heart, thus you will find refreshment for your souls. My yoke is sweet and my burden light." The small field to the north of the church has a statue depicting the Agony in the Garden.

History 
The Ateneo de Manila acquired a campus in what would become Loyola Heights, Quezon City in the late 1940s. In 1952, when the Ateneo transferred to Loyola Heights from Padre Faura St. in Manila, Fr. William Masterson, S.J. envisioned the construction of a church on the campus. However, only the Blue Eagle Gym (located near the Grade School) stood, having been the first structure built in what would eventually be Loyola Heights.

It was not until around 50 years later that construction of the church began. On September 30, 2001 the cornerstone of the church was blessed and laid. The church dedication liturgy for the church was celebrated by Cardinal Jaime Sin on July 31, 2002 and attended by several distinguished guests, including former Philippine President Corazon Aquino.

In 2005, an 18-bell chime and an Angelus bell were added to the church, a donation from the High School class of 1960 and the College class of 1964. The group also donated an additional five bells in 2010, converting the chime into a 23-bell carillon. The bells chime at 6:00 am and 12:00 pm.

Distinctive features 

Inside the Church's western entrance is a semicircle of stained glass depicting the Stations of the Cross.  At the center of the semicircle is the church's holy water font. It is placed on a hole on the floor with rim surrounded by the rays of the Jesuits' seal. The stoup itself is an upright brown stone, with a depression on top acting as the basin and the outlet for the water covered with a clay plate with the Jesuit seal. The water circulates over the sides the basin, therefore the water is not stagnant and does not contain any debris, unlike other water font.

The altar is supported by a slab of adobe rock, believed to be in abundant supply underneath the Loyola Heights campus.  The huge crucifix above the main altar is unusual depicting Jesus still alive looking up to God, contrary to many crucifixes that depict Jesus already dead, his head bowed down.

See also
 List of Jesuit sites

References
"The Bells of Loyola", Paulo Alcazaren, The Philippine Star, 7 January 2006
The university Church of the Gesù, www.ateneo.edu, Ateneo de Manila University (Article by Jose B. R. F. Ignacio, Photos by: Cocoy Sarmenta)

External links

 Ateneo de Manila University
 Church of the Gesù
 Church of the Gesù (archived)
 The bells of Loyola - Heritage Conservation Society website
 Church of the Gesù Bell Tower details of the bells
 Church of the Gesu

Ateneo de Manila University
Jesuit churches in the Philippines
Roman Catholic churches in Quezon City
2001 establishments in the Philippines
Roman Catholic churches completed in 2003
Churches in the Roman Catholic Diocese of Cubao